To banish means to exile, to send away, or to expel.

Banish or banishment may also refer to:

People
Jim Banish, co-founder of itty bitty machine company
Fran Banish, musician on At Ground Zero etc.

Other uses
 Banish, a variant spelling of Banesh, a village in Iran
 Banish (company), based in the United States
 Banish, and Pro-Banish, brand names of Aminopyralid, herbicide
 The Banishment, a 2008 film by Andrey Zvyagintsev

See also
Banished (disambiguation)